The 1978 World Wrestling Championships were held in Mexico City, Mexico. Greco-Roman event on 20–23, and freestyle on 24–27 August respectively.

Medal table

Team ranking

Medal summary

Men's freestyle

Men's Greco-Roman

References

External links
 UWW Database – Select 1978, World Championship Freestyle Seniors 1978-08-24 and World Championship Greco Roman Seniors 1978-08-20

World Wrestling Championships
W
World Wrestling Championships, 1978
1978 in Mexican sports